TWL may refer to:

Thermal work limit, a heat index to prevent heat stress
Titagarh Wagons Limited, railway wagon manufacturer from India
Tournament Word List (officially NASPA Word List), the official word list for English Scrabble in North America, published by NASPA Games
Transepidermal water loss, water loss across epidermis
The Women's Library, Sydney, Australia
That Wikipedia List, a YouTube miniseries

See also

 TWI (disambiguation)
 TW1 (disambiguation)